Cholachagudda is in Bagalkot District (Badami Taluka) Karnataka State of India, it is near Badami. It is on the bank of Malaprabha river which is a tributary of Krishna river. It has two famous Hindu temples dedicated to Banashankari and Virabadhreshwara. It is known for its paan leaves plantation, clove-chillies and banana plantations.

See also

 Banashankari Temple at Cholachagudda
 Badami
 Pattadakal
 Mahakuta
 Aihole
 Gajendragad
 Sudi
 North Karnataka

Villages in Bagalkot district